The 2016 Rossendale Borough Council election took place on 5 May 2016 to elect members to one third of Rossendale Borough Council in England. Councillors elected in 2012 were defending their seats this year, and they will be contested again in 2020. The Labour Party retained control of the Council.

Prior to the election The Labour Party held 19 seats, The Conservatives held 15 and there were 3 Independents. The result was a Labour victory with 3 seats gained 2 from the Conservatives and 1 from Independent. UKIP, The Green Party and National Front along with several Independents also fielded candidates. This was on the same day as other local elections. The Conservative Party required a net gain of three seats to take control of the council. The resulting Labour victory was a surprise. The most surprising was Labour's taking of the seemingly safe Conservative ward of Eden.

State of the Parties
After the election, the composition of the council was:

Election result

Ward results

Cribden

Eden

Incumbent Darryl Smith (Conservative) Not Standing

Facit and Shawforth

Incumbent Mandalene De Souza (Independent) Not Standing

Goodshaw

Greenfield

Greensclough

Hareholme

Helmshore

Incumbent Peter Smith (Conservative) Not Standing

Irwell

Longholme

Whitewell

Worsley

References

2016 English local elections
2016
2010s in Lancashire